Under the old Model-year nomenclature system many different Pieces of equipment had the same Model number.

 M1919 Browning machine gun
 16"/50 caliber M1919 gun
 M1919 Christie 57mm Gun Medium Tank

See also
 M1918 (disambiguation)
 M1920 (disambiguation)